Rissoina tongunensis is a species of minute sea snail, a marine gastropod mollusk or micromollusk in the family Rissoinidae.

Description

Distribution

References

Rissoinidae
Gastropods described in 2008